Pittsburg is a town in Pittsburg County, Oklahoma, United States. The population was 280 at the 2000 census.

History 
The first settlement of present day Pittsburg by non-indigenous peoples was in 1899 when Daniel Edwards, accompanied by son Thomas, placed a coal shaft two miles east of Kiowa, in Choctaw Nation. In 1903, the United States Postal Service established a post office in Cowpers and appointed Daniel Edwards as postmaster. Its name was changed to Edwards, Indian Territory, on September 3, 1903, and to Pittsburg, Oklahoma, on August 27, 1909. During its time as Edwards, it was named for J.R. Edwards, a coal operator. Its newest name, Pittsburg, commemorates the county which was created at Oklahoma's statehood in 1907.

At the time of its founding, the community was located in the Moshulatubbee District of the Choctaw Nation. The town was in the area of the boundary between Atoka and Tobucksy counties, and differing maps of the era placed it in each.

Geography
Pittsburg is located at  (34.712769, -95.850993).

Demographics

At the 2000 census, there were 280 people, 107 households and 84 families residing in the town. The racial make-up was 67.50% White, 22.14% Native American, 0.36% from other races, and 10.00% from two or more races. Hispanic or Latino of any race were 2.14% of the population.

There were 107 households, of which 31.8% had children under the age of 18 living with them, 55.1% were married couples living together, 17.8% had a female householder with no husband present and 20.6% were non-families. 19.6% of all households were made up of individuals, and 12.1% had someone living alone who was 65 years of age or older. The average household size was 2.62 and the average family size was 2.96.

25.7% of the population were under the age of 18, 9.6% from 18 to 24, 26.4% from 25 to 44, 23.9% from 45 to 64 and 14.3% who were 65 years of age or older. The median age was 38 years. For every 100 females, there were 87.9 males. For every 100 females age 18 and over, there were 96.2 males.

The median household income was $19,479 and the median family incomewas $22,250. Males had a median income of $25,833 and females $17,500. The per capita income was $10,258. About 15.5% of families and 21.7% of the population were below the poverty line, including 30.8% of those under the age of eighteen and 12.2% of those 65 or over.

Pittsburgh is generally supportive of the Republican Party in national politics. 84% of the vote in the 2020 presidential election went to Republican incumbent Donald Trump over Democratic challenger Joe Biden.

References

External links
 City-Data profile

Towns in Pittsburg County, Oklahoma
Towns in Oklahoma